Torsten Jülich (born 1 December 1974 in Borna, East Germany) is a German former football player.

Career 
He made his debut on the professional league level in the 2. Bundesliga for VfB Leipzig on 1 March 1997 when he came on as a substitute for Ronald Werner in the 85th minute in a game against 1. FSV Mainz 05.

References

External links
 

1974 births
Living people
People from Borna
German footballers
1. FC Lokomotive Leipzig players
Eintracht Braunschweig players
1. FC Saarbrücken players
2. Bundesliga players
Association football defenders
Footballers from Saxony